Sejde Aftonia Ayllin Abrahamsson (born 24 January 1998) is a Swedish footballer who plays as a midfielder for Belgian Women's Super League club Club YLA.

Honours 
KIF Örebro DFF
Runner-up
 Damallsvenskan: 2014

External links 
 

1998 births
Living people
Swedish women's footballers
Women's association football midfielders
KIF Örebro DFF players
Hammarby Fotboll (women) players
Piteå IF (women) players
Sevilla FC (women) players
S.S.D. Napoli Femminile players
Damallsvenskan players
Swedish expatriate footballers
Swedish expatriate sportspeople in Spain
Expatriate women's footballers in Spain
People from Piteå
Sportspeople from Norrbotten County
SK Slavia Praha (women) players
Expatriate women's footballers in the Czech Republic
Swedish expatriate sportspeople in the Czech Republic
Serie A (women's football) players
Swedish expatriate sportspeople in Italy
Expatriate women's footballers in Italy
Club Brugge KV (women) players
Expatriate women's footballers in Belgium
Swedish expatriate sportspeople in Belgium
Czech Women's First League players